The Chesapeake and Ohio Railway  was a Class I railroad formed in 1869 in Virginia from several smaller Virginia railroads begun in the 19th century. Led by industrialist Collis P. Huntington, it reached from Virginia's capital city of Richmond to the Ohio River by 1873, where the railroad town (and later city) of Huntington, West Virginia, was named for him.

Tapping the coal reserves of West Virginia, the C&O's Peninsula Extension to new coal piers on the harbor of Hampton Roads resulted in the creation of the new City of Newport News. Coal revenues also led the forging of a rail link to the Midwest, eventually reaching Columbus, Cincinnati and Toledo in Ohio and Chicago, Illinois.

By the early 1960s the C&O was headquartered in Cleveland, Ohio. In 1972, under the leadership of Cyrus Eaton, it became part of the Chessie System, along with the Baltimore and Ohio and Western Maryland Railway. The Chessie System was later combined with the Seaboard Coast Line and Louisville and Nashville, both the primary components of the Family Lines System, to become a key portion of CSX Transportation (CSXT) in the 1980s.

C&O's passenger services ended in 1971 with the formation of Amtrak. Today Amtrak's tri-weekly Cardinal passenger train follows the historic and scenic route of the C&O through the New River Gorge in one of the more rugged sections of the Mountain State. The rails of the former C&O also continue to transport intermodal and freight traffic, as well as West Virginia bituminous coal east to Hampton Roads and west to the Great Lakes as part of CSXT, a Fortune 500 company which was one of seven Class I railroads operating in North America at the beginning of the 21st century.

At the end of 1970 C&O operated 5067 miles (8 155 km) of road on 10219 miles (16 446 km) of track, not including WM or B&O and its subsidiaries.

History

Formation, Crozet, and crossing the Blue Ridge Mountains
The Chesapeake & Ohio Railway traced its origin to the Louisa Railroad of Louisa County, Virginia, begun in 1836, and the James River & Kanawha Canal Company, also in Virginia, begun in 1785. The first train ran on December 20, 1837. 
 
Originally a feeder line to connect with the predecessor of the Richmond, Fredericksburg and Potomac Railroad (RF&P) at what is now Doswell, by 1850 the Louisa Railroad had won the right in Virginia courts to build southeast (timetable east) to Richmond in competition with the RF&P. It also expanded west, reaching Charlottesville. In keeping with its new and larger vision, it was renamed the Virginia Central Railroad. However, plans to cross the Blue Ridge Mountains, the first mountain barrier to the west, at Swift Run Gap proved both financially and technically unfeasible.

The Commonwealth of Virginia, always keen to help with internal improvements not only owned a portion of Virginia Central stock through the state Board of Public Works, but incorporated and financed the Blue Ridge Railroad to accomplish the hard and expensive task of crossing the Blue Ridge Mountains. Under the leadership of the great early civil engineer Claudius Crozet, the Blue Ridge RR built over the mountains using four tunnels:  Greenwood Tunnel, Brookville Tunnel, Little Rock Tunnel, and the  Blue Ridge Tunnel at the top of the pass, then one of the longest tunnels in the world.

At the same time, Virginia Central was building westward from the west foot of the Blue Ridge, crossing the Shenandoah Valley (a part of the Great Appalachian Valley) and Great North Mountain, finally reaching the foot of the Alleghany Mountains (note that in Virginia Alleghany is spelled with an "a") in 1856 at a point known as Jackson's River Station, later to be called Clifton Forge.

To finish its line across the mountainous territory of the Alleghany Plateau (known in old Virginia as the "Transmountaine"), the Commonwealth again chartered a state-subsidized railroad called the Covington and Ohio Railroad, authorized by the General Assembly in 1853. This company completed important grading work on the Alleghany grade and did considerable work on numerous tunnels over the mountains and in the west. It also did a good deal of roadway work around Charleston on the Kanawha River. Then the American Civil War intervened, and work was stopped on the westward expansion.

C & O predecessors during the Civil War

During the Civil War the Virginia Central Railroad was one of the Confederacy's most important lines, carrying food from the Shenandoah region to Richmond, and ferrying troops and supplies back and forth as the campaigns surrounded its tracks frequently. It had an important connection with the Orange and Alexandria Railroad at Gordonsville, Virginia. On more than one occasion, the Virginia Central was used in actual tactical operations, transporting troops directly to the battlefield. But, it was a prime target for Federal armies, and by the end of the war had only about five miles (8 km) of track still in operation, and $40 in gold in its treasury.

Collis P. Huntington links Richmond with the Ohio Valley

Following the war, Virginia Central officials, led by company president Williams Carter Wickham, realized that they would have to get capital to rebuild from outside the economically devastated South, and attempted to attract British interests, without success. Finally they succeeded in interesting Collis P. Huntington of New York. Huntington was one of the "Big Four" involved in building the Central Pacific portion of the Transcontinental Railroad, which was not yet reaching completion (May 1869). Huntington had a vision of a true transcontinental railroad that would go from sea to sea under one operating management, and decided that the Virginia Central might be the eastern link to this system.

Huntington supplied the Virginians with the money needed to complete the line to the Ohio River, through what was now the new state of West Virginia. The old Covington & Ohio's properties were conveyed to them [Note: the name was Railroad at this time ... it will be changed later to Railway] in keeping with its new mission of linking the Tidewater coast of Virginia with the "Western Waters." This was the old dream of the "Great Connection" which had been current in Virginia since Colonial times.

On July 1, 1867, the C&O was completed nine miles (14 km) from Jackson's River Station to the town of Covington, county seat of Alleghany County. By 1869, it had crossed Alleghany Mountain, using much of the tunneling and roadway work done by the Covington & Ohio before the war, and was running to the great mineral springs resort at White Sulphur Springs, now in Greenbrier County, West Virginia. Here, stagecoach connections were made for Charleston and the navigation on the Kanawha River (and thus water transportation on the whole Ohio/Mississippi system).

During 1869–1873 the hard work of building through West Virginia was done with large crews working from both ends (as the Union Pacific and Central Pacific Railroads had done from 1863 to 1869 in the transcontinental work): White Sulphur Springs and the new city of Huntington on the Ohio River. The line was completed at Hawks Nest, West Virginia, in the New River Gorge on January 28, 1873. 

The West Virginia stretch of the C&O was the site of the legendary competition between John Henry and a steam-powered machine; the competition is said to have taken place in a tunnel south of Talcott, West Virginia, near the Greenbrier River. The C&O's westward expansion was completed at a cost of $23,394,263.69 (over $414 million in 2010 dollars).

Typical of the men who built the C&O during this period was William Nelson Page, a civil engineer who had attended special courses in engineering at the University of Virginia before he went to work on the railroad. Page directed the location and construction of the New River Gorge Bridge in 1871 and 1872, and of the Mill Creek Canyon bridge in 1874. In 1875 and 1876, he led the surveying party charged with mapping out the route of the double-track railway to extend between Hampton Roads and the Ohio River via the New River and Kanawha Valleys of West Virginia. Like many men who came to West Virginia with the railroad, Page was struck with both the beauty and potential of the natural resources and is considered one of the more energetic and successful men who helped develop West Virginia's rich bituminous coal fields in the late 19th and early 20th century. Page and his wife Emma Hayden Gilham, settled in the tiny mountain hamlet of Ansted, West Virginia, a town located in Fayette County which was named for British geologist David T. Ansted, who had mapped much of the region's coal resources in 1853. The palatial Page Mansion was built on a high bluff overlooking the New River far below, where the C&O occupied both sides of the narrow valley. Between the bridge just below Sewell and the one at Hawks Nest, one track is on the west bank of the New River, and the other on the east bank.
 
Collis Huntington intended to connect the C&O with his western and mid-western holdings, but had much other railroad construction to finance and he stopped the line at the Ohio and over the next few years did little to improve its rough construction or develop traffic. The only connection to the West was by packet boats operating on the Ohio River. Because the great mineral resources of the region hadn't been fully realized yet, the C&O suffered through the bad times brought on by the Financial Panic of 1873, and went into receivership in 1878. Williams C. Wickham was named as its Receiver. When reorganized, it was renamed The Chesapeake & Ohio Railway Company.

West Virginia coal development and Newport News piers

Shortly after the end of the Civil War, Collis P. Huntington and his associates began buying up land in Warwick County, Virginia. During the ten years from 1878 to 1888, C&O's coal resources began to be developed and shipped eastward. Transportation began of southern West Virginia coal to Newport News where it was loaded on coast-wise shipping and transported to the Northeast became a staple of the C&O's business at this time.

In 1881, C&O's new Peninsula Extension was completed from Richmond through the new Church Hill Tunnel and down the Virginia Peninsula through Williamsburg to reach coal piers located on the harbor Hampton Roads, the East Coast of the United States' largest ice-free port. The Peninsula Subdivision featured gentle grades through coastal plains of the Tidewater region of Virginia, dropping only about 30 feet in elevation, from Richmond (54 feet above sea-level) to Newport News (at 15 feet above sea-level).

Collis P. Huntington helped develop the tiny unincorporated community at Newport New Point into a new independent city with the coal and other railroad business and the development of Newport News Shipbuilding and Drydock Company.

In 1883–84 the failure of the railroad to repay a loan led to the failure of the finance company Fisk & Hatch and the Newark Savings Institution (which held much of its money with Fisk & Hatch).

Morgan and Vanderbilt take control
In 1888 Huntington lost control of the C&O in a reorganization without foreclosure that saw his majority interest lost to the interests of J.P. Morgan and William K. Vanderbilt. In those days before US antitrust laws were created, many smaller railroads which appeared to be in competition with each other were essentially under common control. Even the leaders of large Pennsylvania Railroad (PRR) and New York Central Railroad (NYC), ostensibly bitter rivals, had secretly entered into a "community of interests" pact.

Morgan and Vanderbilt had Melville E. Ingalls installed as president. 
Ingalls was, at the time, also President of the Vanderbilt's Cleveland, Cincinnati, Chicago and St. Louis Railroad (The "Big Four System"), and held both presidencies concurrently for the next decade. Ingalls installed George W. Stevens as general manager and effective head of the C&O.

The C&O gains a water level route along the James River across Virginia

In 1889 the Richmond and Allegheny Railroad company, which had been built along the tow-path of the defunct James River and Kanawha Canal, was merged into the C&O, giving it a down grade "water level" line from Clifton Forge to Richmond, avoiding the heavy grades of North Mountain and the Blue Ridge on the original Virginia Central route. On this line, trains descend nearly 1,000 feet in elevation to Richmond (54 feet elevation) following the path of the river. This "James River Line" became the principal artery of eastbound coal transportation down to the present day.

Ingalls and Stevens completely rebuilt the C&O to "modern" standards with ballasted roadbed, enlarged and lined tunnels, steel bridges, and heavier steel rails, as well as new, larger, cars and locomotives.

In 1888, the C&O built the Cincinnati Division, from Huntington, West Virginia,  down the south bank of the Ohio River in Kentucky and across the river at Cincinnati, connecting with the Cleveland, Cincinnati, Chicago and St. Louis Railroad ("Big Four") and other Midwestern Railroads.

Great Lakes shipping, Chicago

From 1900 to 1920 most of the C&O's lines tapping the rich bituminous coal fields of southern West Virginia and eastern Kentucky were built, and the C&O as it was known throughout the rest of the 20th Century was essentially in place.

In 1910 C&O merged the Chicago, Cincinnati & Louisville Railroad into its system. This line had been built diagonally across the state of Indiana from Cincinnati to Hammond in the preceding decade. This gave the C&O a direct line from Cincinnati to the great railroad hub of Chicago.

Also in 1910, C&O interests bought control of the Kanawha and Michigan (K&M) and Hocking Valley Railway (HV) lines in Ohio, with a view to connecting with the Great Lakes through Columbus. But there was no direct connection with the C&O's mainline, now hauling previously undreamed-of quantities of coal. To get its coal up to Toledo and into Great Lakes shipping, C&O contracted with its rival Norfolk & Western to carry trains from Kenova,. W. Va. to Columbus. N&W, however, limited this business and the arrangement was never satisfactory.

C&O gained access to the Hocking Valley by building a new line directly from a point a few miles from its huge and growing terminal at Russell, Ky., to Columbus between 1917 and 1926. It crossed the Ohio River at Limeville, Ky. (Sciotoville, Ohio), on the Sciotoville Bridge. 
With the connection at Columbus complete, C&O soon was sending more of its high quality metallurgical and steam coal west than east, and in 1930 it merged the Hocking Valley into its system.

Miles (kilometres) of road operated at year end: C&O 2635 (4241), HV 349 (562), PM 2305 (3710) in 1925; C&O 3076 (4950), PM 1949 (3137) in 1944; C&O 5067 (8155) in 1970.

Passenger Operations and the "Chessie" Cat mascot

The Chesapeake and Ohio Railway never spent lavishly on streamlined passenger trains, or passenger service in general, opting to put most of its resources into moving coal and freight in general. However, it did have a number of well known passenger trains including the George Washington, Fast Flying Virginian, Sportsman, Pere Marquette, and Resort Special.  While the George Washington was the railroad's flagship, the Sportsman (which connected Washington, D.C., and Newport News) and the Resort Special were also well-traveled trains on the system. Much of the reason for the popularity of C&O's passenger trains was because of Chessie, the sleeping kitten, one of the most successful and fondly remembered marketing campaigns ever developed. Chessie was so popular when she debuted in 1933 that the C&O could not keep enough merchandise in stock.

Chessie sported two kittens, Nip and Tuck. During World War II, Chessie's "husband" — Peake — (creating the name "Chessie Peak", as in Chesapeake) was shown with a bandage on his paw as a war veteran returning from military service.

While the kitten was created by the Austrian artist Guido Grünewald, the success of Chessie as a marketing tool is often credited to Lionel Probert, at the time an assistant to the C&O president.

Van Sweringen era – Pere Marquette Railway

The next significant change for C&O came in 1923 when the great Cleveland financiers, the Van Sweringen brothers (O. P. and M. J. Van Sweringen),  bought a controlling interest in the line as part of their expansion of the Nickel Plate Road (NKP) system. Eventually they controlled the NKP, C&O, Pere Marquette Railroad (in Michigan and Ontario), and Erie railroads. They managed to control this huge (for the time) system by a maze of holding companies and interlocking directorships. This house of cards tumbled when the Great Depression began and the Van Sweringen companies collapsed.

However, the C&O was a strong line. Despite the fact that in the early 1930s over 50% of American railroads went into receivership, it not only avoided bankruptcy, but took the occasion of cheap labor and materials to again completely rebuild itself. During these hard economic times, C&O was boring new tunnels, adding double track, rebuilding bridges, upgrading the weight of its rail, and rebuilding its roadbed, all with money from its principal commodity of haulage: coal. Even during the Great Depression, coal was something that had to be used everywhere, and C&O was sitting astride some of the best bituminous seams in the country. 

Because of this great upgrading and building program, C&O was in prime condition to carry the monumental loads needed during World War II. During the War it transported men and material in unimagined quantities as the U. S. used the Hampton Roads Port of Embarkation as a principal departure point for the European Theater. The invasion of North Africa was loaded there. Of course, in addition to fueling the ships of the U.S. Navy and the merchant marine, coal was also needed in ever increasing quantities by war industries. C&O was ready with a powerful, well organized, well maintained railway powered by the largest and most modern locomotives.

Post World War II – Robert R. Young
By the end of the World War II, C&O was poised to help America during its great growth during the decades following, and at mid-century was truly a line of national importance. It became more so, at least in the public eye through Robert Ralph Young, its mercurial chairman, and his Alleghany Corporation.

Young got control of the C&O through the remnants of the Van Sweringen companies, in 1942, and for the next decade he became "the gadfly of the rails," as he challenged old methods of financing and operating railroads. He regarded himself as a crusader against the mismanagement of railroads by banking interests. Young's most famous advertisement slogan was "A hog can cross the country without changing trains – but you can't."

Nicknamed "Rail Road Young", R.R. Young inaugurated many forward looking advances in technology that have ramifications to the present. He changed the C&O's herald (logo) to "C&O for Progress" to embody his ideas that C&O would lead the industry to a new day. He installed a well-staffed research and development department that came up with ideas for passenger service that are thought to be futuristic even now, and for freight service that would challenge the growth of trucking. Young eventually gave up his C&O position to become Chairman of the New York Central (NYC). However, Young was unable to accomplish results he had promised stockholders at the NYC. A lifelong victim of depression, he committed suicide in 1958.

During the Young era and following, C&O was headed by Walter J. Tuohy, under whose control the "For Progress" theme continued, though in a more muted way after the departure of Young. During this time, C&O installed the first large computer system in railroading, developed larger and better freight cars of all types, switched (reluctantly) from steam to diesel motive power, and diversified its traffic, which had already occurred in 1947 when it merged into the system the old Pere Marquette Railway (PM) of Michigan and Ontario, Canada, which had been controlled by the C&O since Van Sweringen days. The PM's huge automotive industry traffic, taking raw materials in and finished vehicle out, gave C&O some protection from the swings in the coal trade, putting merchandise traffic at 50% of the company's haulage.

Chessie System, CSX

C&O continued to be one of the more profitable and financially sound railways in the United States, and in 1963, under the guidance of Cyrus S. Eaton, helped start the modern merger era by "affiliating" with the Baltimore & Ohio. The two lines' services, personnel, motive power, rolling stock, and facilities were gradually integrated. Under the leadership of Hays T. Watkins, in 1973 Chessie System was created as a holding company for the C&O, B&O and Western Maryland Railway. In effect, C&O formally adopted a nickname that had been used colloquially for the railroad for several years, after the mascot kitten used in ads since 1933.

Under Watkins' leadership, Chessie System then merged with Seaboard Coast Line Industries, holding company for Seaboard Coast Line Railroad and several other great railroads of the Southeast (including Louisville and Nashville Railroad, Clinchfield Railroad and others) to form CSX Corporation, with Chessie and SCL as its leading subsidiaries. Watkins became CEO of the merged company.

Over the next five years, the CSX railroads began consolidating into one mega-railroad. The process began when SCL merged its railroads into the Seaboard System Railroad in 1982.

Western Maryland was merged into B&O on May 1, 1983. B&O was merged into C&O on April 30, 1987. Seaboard changed its name to CSX Transportation on July 1, 1986. Finally, C&O merged into CSX Transportation on Aug. 31, 1987. After acquiring 42% of Conrail in 1999, CSX became one of four major railroad systems left in the country.

See also 

 C&O desk, donated to the White House
 List of Chesapeake and Ohio locomotives
 George Washington, the C&O's premier passenger train from 1932 to 1971
 Charles T. Hinde, Successful businessman and riverboat captain.
 Greenbrier River Trail

References

Further reading

External links 

 Chesapeake and Ohio Historical Society
 Chesapeake and Ohio Railway Heritage Center
 Steam Operations of the Chesapeake & Ohio Railway at Hinton, West Virginia

 
Predecessors of CSX Transportation
Former Class I railroads in the United States
Standard gauge railways in the United States
Baltimore and Ohio Railroad
American companies established in 1878
Railway companies established in 1878
Railway companies disestablished in 1987
Defunct Maryland railroads
Defunct Ohio railroads
Defunct Virginia railroads
Defunct West Virginia railroads
Defunct Washington, D.C., railroads
Defunct Illinois railroads
Defunct Indiana railroads
Defunct Kentucky railroads
Defunct Michigan railroads
Defunct Missouri railroads
Defunct Ontario railways
Railroads in the Chicago metropolitan area
Companies based in Cleveland
Defunct companies based in Ohio
Coal mining in Appalachia
James River (Virginia)
Rail transportation in Cincinnati